KISZ-FM, 97.9 "Kiss Country," is a country music radio station in the Four Corners area of the Western United States.  It is licensed to Cortez, Colorado and is owned by Winton Road Broadcasting Company, LLC.  Bill Kruger-Regional Director, Don Kirk-Program Director.  Overnights feature "Kickin It With Kix", hosted by Kix Brooks.  Weekday mornings are hosted by nationally syndicated Big D, and Bubba.  Evenings feature Lia Night, and the award-winning "Nights with Lia" Monday through Saturday.  "Solid Gold Saturday Morning" airs 6-10am each Saturday morning.  Sunday's feature the "American Christian Music Review", Thunder Road", "American Country Countdown", and "The Road".

The station also has a booster, KISZ-FM1 in Farmington, New Mexico.

KISZ went on the air on April 17, 1979.  Before becoming “Kiss Country” in the 1990s, it was “Kiss 98” with a Top 40 format.

External links
Official website

ISZ-FM
Country radio stations in the United States